The Battle of Qbaada was a last stand battle in 1864 fought between the last remains of the Circassians and the Russian imperial forces during the Russo-Circassian War. It is widely accepted as the last battle of the war as no other significant battle, other than minor rebellions, occurred.

History 
The battle took place in Qbaada in 1864 between the Circassian army of 20,000 men and women, consisting of local villagers and militia as well as tribal horsemen and a Russian army of 100,000 men, consisting of Cossack and Russian horsemen, infantry and artillery. The Russian forces advanced from four sides. Circassian forces tried to break the line, but many were hit by Russian artillery and infantry before they managed to reach the front. The remaining fighters continued to fight as militants and were soon defeated. The Russian army began celebrating victory on the corpses, and a military-religious parade was held, as 100 Circassian warriors were publicly mutilated in a public execution in order to establish authority. The Russian army then continued raiding and burning Circassian villages, destroying fields to prevent return, cutting down trees, and driving the people to the Black Sea coast, the soldiers used many methods to entertain themselves.

References 

Caucasian War
19th-century conflicts